André Aubut was a Canadian ice hockey defenseman who was an All-American for Maine.

Career
Aubut was a member of the second recruiting class for the Black Bears when they restarted their ice hockey program in the late 1970s. After a good freshman campaign where he was named ECAC 2 rookie of the year, Maine jumped up to Division I. Predictably, the team finished with a losing record, but only by a few games. Maine performed rather well as a new entry into ECAC Hockey and Aubut became the program's first All-American in 1980. His numbers improved and nearly equaled what he scored as a freshman the next season as Maine finished tied for 5th in the conference and made their first conference tournament at the D-I level. With so many players from the initial class graduating after 1981, the team tumbled down the standings and ended up last in their conference. While Aubut was still a promising prospect, he played just a few games for minor professional clubs before retiring. In April 1993, while playing pickup hockey in Montreal, Aubut suffered a freak injury that left him paralyzed. He died in August at Sacré-Coeur Hospital in Montreal.

In 1988, Aubut was inducted into the Maine Athletics Hall of Fame, the first ice hockey player so honored. He also received the most votes for the Black Bears' first All-decade team. As of 2021, Aubus is still the Black Bears all-time leader in goals (tied) and points by a defenseman.

Statistics

Regular season and playoffs

Awards and honors

References

External links

1960 births
1993 deaths
Ice hockey people from Quebec
People from Gaspé, Quebec
Canadian ice hockey defencemen
AHCA Division I men's ice hockey All-Americans
Maine Black Bears men's ice hockey players
Laval National players
Fredericton Express players
Oklahoma City Stars players
Sport deaths in Canada